Temptation is the debut studio album by South Korean entertainer Harisu, released on September 22, 2001. The songs are a mix of techno-style K-pop and slow ballads, and a music video was filmed for the title track, "Temptation". It peaked at #32 on the MIAK K-pop albums chart, and sold 25,474 copies in its first two months of release.

Temptation was also released in Taiwan, where it was packaged with a hardcover photobook and bonus VCD.

Track listing 
 "Prologue" – 2:04
 "악몽 (Nightmare)" – 3:26
 "D-Day" – 3:48
 "Temptation" – 3:43
 "Knife" – 3.54
 "Love Hurt" – 3:43
 "비밀 (Secret)" – 3:43
 "Shadow" – 3:47
 "이별속에서 (Separation)" – 4:01
 "Fantasy" – 3:29
 "Memory" – 4:03
 "Don't Stop" – 3:46

Notes and references 

2001 debut albums
Harisu albums
Kakao M albums